Ackerville Stadium is a multi-use stadium in Witbank, Mpumalanga,  South Africa.  It is currently used mostly for football matches and is the home ground of Calaska F.C. who play in the Vodacom League.

References 

Sports venues in Mpumalanga
Soccer venues in South Africa